Chen Jianxin (born 15 June 1992 in Jiuxian, Beijing) is a Chinese wheelchair curling player. He participated at the 2018 Winter Paralympics and 2022 Winter Paralympics, and won a gold medal at both games.

Career
His legs were amputated in 2010 following a motorcycle accident.

References

External links 

1992 births
Living people
Chinese male curlers
Chinese wheelchair curlers
Paralympic wheelchair curlers of China
Paralympic medalists in wheelchair curling
Paralympic gold medalists for China
Wheelchair curlers at the 2018 Winter Paralympics
Wheelchair curlers at the 2022 Winter Paralympics
Medalists at the 2018 Winter Paralympics
Medalists at the 2022 Winter Paralympics
Sportspeople from Beijing
21st-century Chinese people